

Map 

The map data is from year 2013, where data is available, from the World Bank. Numbers are in percentage.

Table 

The table uses an interval of years from the World Bank. Numbers are in percentage.

See also

Plotted maps
European countries by electricity consumption per person
European countries by employment in agriculture (% of employed)
European countries by health expense per person
European countries by military expenditure as a percentage of government expenditure
European countries by percent of population aged 0-14
European countries by percentage of urban population
European countries by percentage of women in national parliaments
List of sovereign states in Europe by life expectancy
List of sovereign states in Europe by number of Internet users

References

External links 

Lists of countries in Europe
Energy in Europe